KB Karlskoga FF is a Swedish football club located in Karlskoga. The club was founded in 1963 following the merger of IFK Bofors and Karlskoga IF. KB means Karlskoga/Bofors.

Background
Since their foundation in 1963 KB Karlskoga FF has participated mainly in the middle and lower divisions of the Swedish football league system. Sven-Göran Eriksson and Tord Grip both played for the club in the early 1970s, the latter as player-coach. The club currently plays in Division 2 Västra Götaland which is the fourth tier of Swedish football. They play their home matches at the Nobelstadion in Karlskoga.

The club is affiliated to the Värmlands Fotbollförbund.

Season to season

External links
 KB Karlskoga FF – Official Website

Footnotes

KB Karlskoga
Football clubs in Örebro County
Association football clubs established in 1963
1963 establishments in Sweden